Oddvar Vargset (6 October 1925 – 23 November 1997) was a Norwegian wrestler. He competed in the men's Greco-Roman welterweight at the 1956 Summer Olympics.

References

External links
 

1925 births
1997 deaths
Norwegian male sport wrestlers
Olympic wrestlers of Norway
Wrestlers at the 1956 Summer Olympics
People from Narvik
Sportspeople from Nordland
20th-century Norwegian people